Teratoneura is a genus of butterflies in the family Lycaenidae, endemic to the Afrotropical realm.

Species
Teratoneura congoensis Stempffer, 1954
Teratoneura isabellae Dudgeon, 1909

References

 Seitz, A. Die Gross-Schmetterlinge der Erde 13: Die Afrikanischen Tagfalter. Plate XIII 65 c

Poritiinae
Lycaenidae genera